is a Japanese curler from Nagano. She is the alternate of the Chubu Electric Power curling team, which won the Japan Curling Championships in both 2017 and 2019. She also won the championship three times with the former Chubu Electric team from 2012 to 2014. At the international level, she has represented Japan three times at the World Women's Curling Championship and three times at the Pacific-Asia Curling Championships, winning a silver medal in both 2012 and 2019.

Career
Matsumura made her international debut at the 2011 Pacific-Asia Curling Championships as alternate on the Japanese team skipped by Satsuki Fujisawa. The team went 2–4 through the double round robin, placing them third in the preliminary round. They then lost to Korea in the semifinal and New Zealand in the bronze medal game, settling for fourth. The team returned the following season after winning the Japan Curling Championships and saw much better results. They went through the round robin of the 2012 Pacific-Asia Curling Championships with a 6–4 record, again placing third. They then defeated Korea's Kim Eun-jung in the semifinal before losing the final to China's Wang Bingyu. Their silver medal placement was enough to earn them a spot at the 2013 World Women's Curling Championship. There, the team just missed the tiebreakers with a 5–6 record. Chubu Electric Power defended their national title the following season, however would not represent Japan at the 2013 Pacific-Asia Curling Championships. In September 2013, Team Fujisawa, who had won the last three straight national championships, participated in the national trials for the 2013 Olympic Qualification Event. They lost the best-of-seven final of the trials to Ayumi Ogasawara's Sapporo-based rink in six games, which eliminated their chances of competing at the 2014 Winter Olympic Games. Team Fujisawa did participated in the 2014 Continental Cup of Curling as part of Team World, where they lost to the North Americans. In Grand Slam play, the team reached the semifinals of the 2014 Curlers Corner Autumn Gold Curling Classic, where they were eliminated by Jennifer Jones.

A few seasons later, Matsumura and her new team of Emi Shimizu, Ikue Kitazawa, Hasumi Ishigooka and Seina Nakajima won the 2017 Japan Curling Championships during the 2016–17 season. After suffering defeats to former teammate Satsuki Fujisawa's new Loco Solare rink in both the round robin and 1 vs. 2 page playoff games, the team edged Fujisawa by a score of 7–5 in the final game. Although they won the national championship, the team did not compete in the 2017 World Women's Curling Championship as Team Fujisawa failed to finish in the top two at the 2016 Pacific-Asia Curling Championships. Also during the 2016–17 season, Team Matsumura finished runner-up at the 2016 Canad Inns Women's Classic World Curling Tour event, falling in the final to Rachel Homan.

In September 2017, the 2017 Japanese Olympic Curling Trials were held between Japan's top two rinks, Loco Solare (Satsuki Fujisawa) and Chubu Electric Power (Matsumura) to determine Japan's representative in the women's event for the 2018 Winter Olympics. After splitting the first two games, Team Fujisawa won the next two games to secure a 3–1 victory in the best-of-five series. At the 2018 national championship, Team Matsumura could not defend their title as they fell in the semifinal game to Fujikyu (Tori Koana).

The following season, the team altered their lineup, moving Matsumura down to third and alternate Seina Nakajima to skip. On the tour, the team reached the final of the Hokkaido Bank Curling Classic and the semifinals of both the Red Deer Curling Classic and the Karuizawa International. At the 2019 Japan Championship, the team went undefeated through the round robin with a perfect 8–0 record. They then defeated Loco Solare again in the 1 vs. 2 game to advance to the final, where they again faced Fujisawa. In the final, Team Nakajima took four in the fifth end followed by a steal of three in the sixth, aiding them in securing their second Japanese championship. By winning the Japanese championship, Matsumura and teammates Seina Nakajima, Ikue Kitazawa, Hasumi Ishigooka and Emi Shimizu represented Japan at the 2019 World Women's Curling Championship. At the world championships, the team squeaked into the playoffs with a 6–6 record, before upsetting the third place Russian team in the quarterfinals. They then lost to Sweden in the semifinal, and lost to South Korea in the bronze medal game, settling for fourth place.

Matsumura and her team represented Japan at the 2019 Pacific-Asia Curling Championships in Shenzhen, China the following season. After going 6–1 in the round robin and defeating Hong Kong in the semifinal, they lost in the final to China's Han Yu. The team lost in the final of the Advics Cup at the start of the season, and reached the semifinals of the International Bernese Ladies Cup. At the 2020 Japan Curling Championships, Team Nakajima once again went undefeated through the round robin with an 8–0 record. They then lost in the 1 vs. 2 game to Fujisawa, before bouncing back with a semifinal victory over Hokkaido Bank Fortius (Sayaka Yoshimura). In a tight final game, Loco Solare scored a single in an extra end to win the national championship by a final score of 7–6.

Team Nakajima played in no World Curling Tour events during the abbreviated 2020–21 season as there were no events held in Japan or Asia. The team would compete in their national championship, held from February 7 to 14, 2021 in Wakkanai, Hokkaido. The team posted a 4–2 record through the round robin of the national championship, earning them a spot in the 3 vs. 4 page playoff game. After defeating Fujikyu in the 3 vs. 4, they lost in the semifinal to Hokkaido Bank Fortius, eliminating them from contention.

Back on tour for the 2021–22 season, Team Nakajima finished third at the 2021 Hokkaido Bank Curling Classic. Because Team Fujisawa won the 2021 Japanese Olympic Curling Trials and were representing Japan at the 2022 Winter Olympics, a world championship trial was held between Chubu Electric Power, Fujikyu and Hokkaido Bank Fortius to determine who would represent Japan at the 2022 World Women's Curling Championship. Chubu Electric posted a 3–1 record in the qualifying round, earning them a spot in the best-of-three final against Yoshimura. After splitting the first two games, the Nakajima rink took one in the tenth end of the final game to earn the berth as Team Japan at the World Championship. The team altered their lineup for the World Championship, moving Matsumura to alternate on the team. In Prince George, British Columbia, Canada for the Worlds, the Japanese team again went 6–6 through the round robin, however, it was not enough to qualify for the playoff round, and they placed seventh.

Aside from women's curling, Matsumura competes in mixed doubles curling as well with partner Yasumasa Tanida. In 2020, the pair won the Japan Mixed Doubles Curling Championship and were set to represent Japan at the 2020 World Mixed Doubles Curling Championship before it was cancelled due to COVID-19. The pair returned to the 2021 championship and reached the final, where they lost to Matsumura's brother Yuta Matsumura and his partner Yurika Yoshida. In September 2021, the 2021 Japanese mixed doubles curling Olympic trials were held to determine the team that would represent Japan at the 2021 Olympic Qualification Event for the chance to earn a berth into the 2022 Winter Olympics. After going 3–1 in the round robin stage, Matsumura and Tanida defeated Yoshida and Matsumura two games to zero in the best-of-three final to earn the right to represent Japan. At the Olympic Qualification Event, the pair just missed the playoffs after losing their final round robin game to Finland. Despite this, they were still named as the Japanese representatives for the 2022 World Mixed Doubles Curling Championship. At the Worlds, the team went 6–3 through the round robin, just missing the playoffs after losing their final round robin game to Sweden's Isabella Wranå and Rasmus Wranå.

Personal life
Her brother Yuta Matsumura is also a curler. She is employed as an officer worker.

Grand Slam record

Former events

Teams

Women's

Mixed doubles

References

External links

Chubu Electric Power Curling Team: Official site (in Japanese)
Chubu Electric Power
Kazuizawa Curling Club: Official site (in Japanese)

Living people
1992 births
People from Karuizawa, Nagano
Japanese female curlers
Japanese curling champions
Continental Cup of Curling participants
20th-century Japanese women
21st-century Japanese women